Expedition was a 30-gun pinnance in the service of the English Navy Royal. She spent her career in Home Waters. During the English Civil War she was employed in the Parliamentary Naval Force. In 1651 she was assigned to the Commonwealth Navy. She was in the Battle of Gabbard and Scheveningen in 1653. Upon the Restoration in 1660 she participated in the battles of Lowestoffe, Four Days' Fight and Orfordness in 1666. She was converted to a fireship then sold in 1667.

Expedition was the second named vessel since it was used for a 20-gun French ship captured in 1618 and listed until 1652.

Construction and specifications
She was ordered on 12 December 1636 to be built under contract by Matthew Graves at Bermondsry in London on the River Thames. She was launched on 20 March 1637. Their builder's measure was  tons.

Her gun armament was, in 1638, 30 guns. Under the 1666 establishment it consisted of seven culverins, thirteen demi-culverines, six 6-pounder guns, ten sakers plus two 3-pounders. Her manning was around 120 officers and men in 1652 and raised to 140 in 1653.

Commissioned service

Service in the English Navy Royal
She was commissioned in 1638 under the command of Captain Robert Slingsby who held command into 1639. In 1640 she came under the command of Captain Richard Seaman who held command until 1641.

Service during English Civil War and Commonwealth Navy
In 1642 she was commissioned into the Parliamentary Naval Forces under the command of Captain Baldwin (or Isaac) Wake for service in the English Channel. In 1643 Captain Brooks then later in the year Captain Joseph Jordan for service in Irish Waters until 1646. During the winter of 1646-47 she was under the command of Sir George Ayscue for service with the Winter Guard. For 1647-48 She was again under Captain Jordan with the Western Guard and in the Irish Sea. In 1650 she was under the command of Captain Abraham Wheeler at the blockade of Lisbon, Portugal. In 1651 she was under the command of Captain Thomas Vallis.

The First Anglo-Dutch War
Expedition was a member of Robert Blake's Fleet at the Battle of Portland from 18 to 20 February 1653. She was present at the Battle of the Gabbard as a member of White Squadron Van Division from s to 3 June 1653. She followed this with the Battle of Scheveningen near Texel on 31 July 1653. She was a member of White Squadron, Van Division. She was at Chatham during the winter of 1653–54.

During 1656 thru 1659 she was under the command of Captain Edward Thompson for operations in the Sound.

Service after the Restoration
From 21 November to 2 January 1665 she was under the command of Captain Valentine Piend. From 31 January to 27 February 1665 she was under the command of Captain Captain James Ableson.

Second Anglo-Dutch War
With the start of the Second Anglo-Dutch War Captain Tobias Sackler took command on 10 March 1665 until his death on 30 July 1666. As a member of White Squadron, Van Division, she participated in the Battle of Lowestoft on 3 June 1665. She was part of Rear-Admiral Sir Thomas Teddiman's Squadron in the Battle of Vagen (at Bergen, Norway). Unfortunately she was unable to enter the harbour and therefore was unengaged in the battle. At the Four Days' Battle, she arrived as a member of Van Division in Prince Rupert's Squadron on 4 June 1666 suffering two killed and three wounded. She was also involved in the St James Day Battle as a member of White Squadron, Van Division on 25 July 1666. Captain Denjamin Simmonds took over command on 31 July 1666 after the death of Captain Sackler. Captain Simmonds was followed by Captain John Turner on 6 September 1666 until 19 October 1666. On 27 February 1667, Captain Turner took command again until 23 May.

Disposition
Expedition was converted to a fireship in June 1667, then sold in October 1667.

Notes

Citations

References
 British Warships in the Age of Sail (1603 – 1714), by Rif Winfield, published by Seaforth Publishing, England © Rif Winfield 2009, EPUB 
 Fleet Actions, 1.5 Battle of Portland
 Fleet Actions, 1.7 Battle of the Gabbard
 Fleet Actions, 1.8 Battle of Scheveningen
 Fleet Actions, 3.1 Battle of Lowestoft
 Fleet Actions, 3.2 Battle of Vagen (Bergen, Norway)
 Fleet Actions, 3.3 Battle of the Galloper Sand (the Four Days' Battle)
 Fleet actions, 3.4 Battle of Orfordness (the St James Day Battle)
 Chapter 4, The Fourth Rates - 'Small Ships', Vessels Acquired from 24 March 1603, 1637 Group, Expedition
 Ships of the Royal Navy, by J.J. Colledge, revised and updated by Lt-Cdr Ben Warlow and Steve Bush, published by Seaforth Publishing, Barnsley, Great Britain, © the estate of J.J. Colledge, Ben Warlow and Steve Bush 2020, EPUB , Section E (Expedition)
 The Arming and Fitting of English Ships of War 1600 - 1815, by Brian Lavery, published by US Naval Institute Press © Brian Lavery 1989, Part V Guns, Type of Guns

 

Ships of the Royal Navy
1630s ships